The 2014–15 Euroleague Basketball Next Generation Tournament, also called Adidas Next Generation Tournament by sponsorship reasons, was  the 13th edition of the international junior basketball tournament organized by the Euroleague Basketball Company.

As in past years, 32 teams joined the first stage, which was played in four qualifying tournaments between December 2014 and February 2015. The four group winners, Crvena Zvezda Telekom as reigning champions and three wildcarded teams joined the Final Tournament, that was played in Madrid on May 14–17.

Qualifying tournaments

Torneo Città di Roma
The Torneo Città di Roma was played on December 27 to 29, 2014.

Group A

Group B

Classification games

7th place game

5th place game

3rd place game

Final

Torneig de Bàsquet Junior Ciutat de L'Hospitalet
The Torneig de Bàsquet Junior Ciutat de L'Hospitalet was played on January 4 to 6, 2015.

Group A

Group B

Semifinals

Classification games
7th place game

5th place game

No third place game was played

Final

Kaunas International Junior Tournament
The Kaunas International Junior Tournament was played on January 16 to 18, 201.

Group A

Group B

3rd place game

Final

Marko Ivković Tournament (Belgrade)
The Marko Ivković Tournament was played from February 27 to March 1, 2015.

Group A

Group B

Semifinals

Classification games
7th place game

5th place game

3rd place game

Final

Final tournament
The Final Tournament of the Euroleague NGT was played at Polideportivo Antonio Magariños, in Madrid, Spain by the four champions of the qualifying tournaments and four wildcarded teams by the Euroleague on March 20, 2015. The Championship Game was hosted at the Barclaycard Center, hours before of the final game of the 2015 Euroleague Final Four.

Group A

Group B

Final

References

External links
Next Generation tournament website

Euroleague Basketball Next Generation Tournament
Next Generation Tournament